Peng Chau Theatre is a defunct cinema on the island of Peng Chau in Hong Kong.

History
The cinema was inaugurated on the eve of the Lunar New Year (6 February), 1978 by Deacon Chiu Te Ken of the Far East Consortium International Limited. The opening ceremony was officiated by John Rawling Todd who was Acting Secretary for the New Territories at the time. The first film to show in the theatre was Gang of Four.

Operation
The cinema had a seating capacity of 499.

Decline
Due to the decline of industry on Peng Chau and the subsequent decline in population, coupled with the increased popularity of at-home entertainment during the 1970s and 80s, the cinema fell into disuse and was shuttered in the late 1980s. On 8 September 2016 the Antiquities Advisory Board reviewed the heritage grading of the building and declined to give the building a heritage grade.

See also
 List of cinemas in Hong Kong

References

External links

 Antiquities Advisory Board. Pictures of Former Peng Chau Theatre

Peng Chau
Cinemas in Hong Kong
Former cinemas
1978 establishments in Hong Kong